Orlen KolTrans is a Polish rail company operating as a part of PKN Orlen. Orlen KolTrans is responsible for transporting PKN Orlen products and delivering crude oil to refineries.

See also 
 Transportation in Poland
 List of railway companies
 Polish locomotives designation

Resource
 Companies official website, URL accessed 2 March 2006

Railway companies of Poland